The General Electric LM6000 is a turboshaft aeroderivative gas turbine engine. The LM6000 is derived from the CF6-80C2 aircraft turbofan. It has additions and modifications designed to make it more suitable for marine propulsion, industrial power generation, and marine power generation use. These include an expanded turbine section to convert thrust into shaft power, supports and struts for mounting on a steel or concrete deck, and reworked controls packages for power generation. It has found wide use including peaking power plants, fast ferries and high speed cargo ship applications.

Design and development

The LM6000 provides  from either end of the low-pressure rotor system, which rotates at 3,600 rpm. This twin spool design with the low pressure turbine operating at 60 Hz, the dominant electrical frequency in North America, eliminates the need for a conventional power turbine. Its high efficiency and installation flexibility make it ideal also for a wide variety of utility power generation and industrial applications, especially peaker and cogeneration plants. 

GE has several option packages for industrial LM6000s, including SPRINT (Spray Inter-Cooled Turbine), water injection (widely known as "NOx water"), STIG (Steam Injected Gas Turbine) technology and DLE (Dry Low Emissions) which utilizes a combustor with premixers to maximize combustion efficiency.   The  SPRINT option is designed to increase efficiency and power of the turbine, while the water injection, STIG and DLE are for reducing emissions. An alternative form of power augmentation is Evaporative Cooling, which is a water fogging system that sprays a fine mist of water into the inlet air before the air filters.   This system is high maintenance and may be replaced by chillers in newer units.  The SPRINT system injects demineralized water into the engine either upstream of the low pressure compressor or between the low pressure and high pressure compressors.  The water injection system injects water into the primary or secondary fuel nozzle inputs, usually on natural gas fired engines.  

The GE LM6000 PC is rated to provide more than 43 MW with a thermal efficiency of around 42% LHV at ISO conditions.  With options, this can be increased to around 50 MW rated power.

Applications
Over 1000 LM6000 gas turbines shipped and over 21 million hours of operation. Applications include power generation for combined cycle or peak power. Other applications include combined heat and power for industrial and independent power producers.

See also

References

External links

 GE LM6000 website

Aero-derivative engines
Marine engines
Gas turbines